Schongau station is a railway station in the town of Schongau, in the district of Weilheim-Schongau in Upper Bavaria, Germany. It is located at the junction of the Landsberg am Lech–Schongau and Schongau–Peißenberg lines of Deutsche Bahn.

Services
 the following services stop at Schongau:

References

External links
 
 Schongau layout 
 

Railway stations in Bavaria
Railway stations in Germany opened in 1886
1886 establishments in Bavaria
Buildings and structures in Weilheim-Schongau